Benjamin "Ben" C. Stark is an American biologist and a professor at the Illinois Institute of Technology. He grew up in a small city in mid-Michigan in the 1950s-1960s. After high school he majored in cellular biology at the University of Michigan (B.S. 1971) and later he received his master (M.Sc. 1974) and doctoral (Ph.D. 1977) degrees from Yale University with Sidney Altman. After two postdoctoral positions, he took a faculty position at Illinois Institute of Technology, where he has worked since. He has carried out research in the area of genetic engineering and RNA biology.

He was one of the co-discoverers of RNase P, a catalytic RNA, in the laboratory of Sidney Altman who shared the Nobel Prize in Chemistry with Thomas R. Cech in 1989 for their work on the catalytic properties of RNA. Other major accomplishment of Stark includes the discovery of enhancement of productivity of recombinant organisms engineered to express the Vitreoscilla hemoglobin (VHb (hemoglobin)), the first bacterial hemoglobin. He has over 80 peer-reviewed publications.

Stark's research has been recognized by many awards, including Honor Award for University Research by the American Academy of Environmental Engineers and Scientists (2013), Person of the Millennium (IIT Millennium Project, 1999),and the Teaching Excellence Award (Lewis College, IIT, 1988).

References 

1955 births
Living people
Yale University alumni
Illinois Institute of Technology faculty
American bioengineers
Biotechnologists
University of Michigan College of Literature, Science, and the Arts alumni
Scientists from Michigan